Underwater Hockey Wales (UHW) (Welsh: Hoci Tanddwr Cymreig (HTC)) is responsible for underwater hockey (also known as Octopush) in Wales. It is the association representing British Octopush Association (BOA) clubs based in Wales. It has seven member clubs. Underwater Hockey Wales is affiliated to the Welsh Association of Sub Aqua Clubs – the national governing body for underwater sports in Wales, comprising scuba diving, underwater hockey, and snorkelling.

Underwater Hockey Wales aims to establish a structured and stable underwater hockey organization in Wales, to support individual, club and regional development. Underwater Hockey Wales is responsible for the training and management of Welsh national squads. The first training camp for the Wales national team was in November 2019 and further camps have taken place every few months. Its objective is to create and maintain competitive Welsh underwater hockey squads in all categories, to compete in both regional competitions and in the BOA home international tournaments.

Underwater Hockey Wales is also responsible for organising the Welsh national championships for Welsh clubs teams which occurs on an annual basis. The most recent edition was its 46th held in 2022.

The British Octopush Association currently has four of its 70 associated clubs in Wales, a large reduction since the COVID-19 pandemic, these are: Bangor University, Cardiff and Newport, Llwchwr, and Pembroke. Pembroke is Wales most successful club, often winning the Welsh national championships, and regularly qualifying in the finals of the British national championship and competing in the top division of Nautilus.

Celtic Cup results

Welsh National Championship winners

See also
 List of sports governing bodies in Wales

References

Water sports in Wales
Underwater hockey governing bodies